Ernst Tiburzy (26 December 1911 – 14 November 2004) was a German Volkssturm ("Peoples Assault") member during World War II who received the Knight's Cross of the Iron Cross for his performance fighting alone and the destruction of five T-34s with Panzerfausts during the defense of Königsberg on February 10, 1945. He is one of only four Volkssturm members to have been awarded the Knight's Cross of the Iron Cross.

References

Citations

Bibliography

 

1911 births
2004 deaths
People from Olecko County
People from East Prussia
Recipients of the Knight's Cross of the Iron Cross
Volkssturm personnel